Raphicerus is a genus of small antelopes of the tribe Neotragini (subfamily Antilopinae).

Raphicerus is endemic to sub-Saharan Africa, ranging from Kenya in the north to the Western Cape in South Africa.

The genus contains three species:

 Cape or southern grysbok R. melanotis
 Sharpe's or northern grysbok R. sharpei
 Steenbok R. campestris

References 

Dwarf antelopes
 
Mammal genera
Taxa named by Charles Hamilton Smith